John Dory is Child ballad number 284. The fish John Dory may be named for the title person.
The song is a three-part round. The first printing of the tune and text is 1609 in Thomas Ravenscroft's Deuteromelia songbook but there are earlier mentions of the song in books. It was quite popular, and both parodies and satires were written to the same melody.

Synopsis
John Dory, a ship's captain (perhaps a pirate, likely French) appeals to the king of France for a pardon, promising to bring him captive Englishmen. The first ship John Dory meets is a "good black bark" (ship) with "50 oars on a side" owned by Nicholl, a Cornish man. After a battle, John Dory is captured.

The king mentioned in the song ("good King John of France") might well be John II of France (1319–1364) who was known as "John the Good".

See also
 List of the Child Ballads

References
Early Child Ballads

External links
John Dory

Child Ballads
Songs about pirates
Year of song unknown